John Cowles may refer to:

 John Cowles Sr. (1898–1983), American newspaper and magazine publisher
 John Cowles Jr. (1929–2012), American editor and publisher
 John Cowles (mineralogist), namesake of Cowlesite
 John Cowles (politician) (fl. 1881), member of the 104th New York State Legislature for Monroe County